Lleyton Hewitt was the defending champion and won in the final 6–4, 6–1 against Magnus Norman.

Seeds
A champion seed is indicated in bold text while text in italics indicates the round in which that seed was eliminated.

  Magnus Norman (final)
  Lleyton Hewitt (champion)
  Wayne Ferreira (first round)
  Cédric Pioline (first round)
  Arnaud Clément (second round)
  Sébastien Grosjean (semifinals)
  Tommy Haas (second round)
  Younes El Aynaoui (first round)

Draw

Qualifying

Seeds

 n/a
  Chris Woodruff (final round)
  Christophe Rochus (Qualifier)
  Alberto Martín (first round)
  Paul Goldstein (final round)
  Alexander Popp (first round)
  David Sánchez (second round)
  Ivan Ljubičić (first round)

Qualifiers

  George Bastl
  Scott Draper
  Christophe Rochus
  Jeff Tarango

Draw

First qualifier

Second qualifier

Third qualifier

Fourth qualifier

References
 2001 Adidas International Draw
 2001 Adidas International Singles Qualifying Draw

Men's Singles
Singles